Family Talk is a Christian focused talk radio channel on the Sirius XM Radio service Sirius channel 161 and XM channel 131 (previously 170). It replaced FamilyNet Radio's Sirius XM feed on November 30, 2010. It was added to XM Radio Canada on April 1, 2007. The station remained on Sirius 161 until May 4, 2011 when Sirius XM moved the station on both XM and Sirius to Channel 131.

References

External links

Family Talk on Sirius XM

XM Satellite Radio channels
Sirius XM Radio channels
Christian radio stations in the United States
Radio stations established in 2001
Salem Media Group properties